Thin Ice is an American hardcore band, where they primarily play a hardcore punk style of music. They come from San Antonio, Texas. The band started making music in 2009. The band released an extended play, Revelation Through Tribulation, in 2010, with Blood and Ink Records. After a long hiatus, the album Misery Noose was self-released in late 2018. The band has recently finished recording a second LP with plans to release sometime in 2020.

Members
Current
 Jake Gallegos – Vocals (2009 -present) 
 Drew O'Neal – Drums (2009 - Present)
 Brody Raney – Guitar (2011 - 2020, 2022 - Present)
 Nick Gonzales – Guitar (2011 - Present)
Former
 Phil Gallegos – Vocals
 Chris Cosgrove – Guitar
 Evan Warren – Guitar
 Bruce Gonzales – Bass/vocals
 Forrest Eleuterius – Bass
 Darren A - Guitar/Bass
Touring
 Levi Miller - Bass
 Jaime Luna - Drums

Discography
EPs
 Revelation Through Tribulation (May 25, 2010, Blood and Ink)

LPs
 Misery Noose (December 5, 2018 self-released)
 Ascending (2021, self released)

References

External links
 Facebook profile
 Blood and Ink Records

Musical groups from San Antonio
2009 establishments in Texas
Musical groups established in 2009
Blood and Ink Records artists